This is a list of current and former ambassadors from Finland. Note that some Ambassadors are responsible for more than one country while others are directly accredited from Helsinki or other capital cities.

Africa

Abuja (Nigeria)

Addis Abeba (Ethiopia)

Alger (Algeria)

Dar es Salaam (Tanzania)

Cairo (Egypt)

Lusaka (Zambia)

Maputo (Mozambique)

Finland's diplomatic relations to Mozambique was Incumbented from Dar es Salaam (1975–1999) and Pretoria (1999–2003) Embassies

Nairobi (Kenya)

Pretoria (South Africa)

Rabat (Morocco)

Finland's diplomatic relations to Morocco was Incumbented from Rome (1959–1961), Algeries (1963–1968), Vienna (1968–1970), Madrid (1970–1990), Lisbon (1992–2007) embassies

Tunis (Tunisia)

Windhoek (Namibia)

Asia

Ankara (Turkey)

Astana (Kazakhstan)

Abu Dhabi (United Arab Emirates)

Baghdad (Iraq)

The Embassy was closed during the Gulf War.

Bangkok (Thailand)

Beirut (Lebanon)

Canberra (Australia)

Damascus (Syria)

Beijing

Republic of China

People's Republic of China

Hanoi (Vietnam)

Islamabad (Pakistan)

Finland's diplomatic relations to Pakistan was Incumbented by Ankara (1951–1974) and Tehran (1974–2001) Embassies

Jakarta (Indonesia)

Kabul (Afghanistan)

Katmandu (Nepal)

Kuala Lumpur (Malaysia)

Kuwait

Finland's diplomatic relations to Kuwait is Incumbented by the Embassy in Riyadh since 2002.

Manila (Philippines)

 Finland's diplomatic relations with the Philippines were redirected to the Embassy in Kuala Lumpur from 2012 until 2020, when the Finnish government reopened the embassy in Manila and inaugurated honorary consulates in Cebu and Davao.

New Delhi (India)

Riyadh (Saudi Arabia)

Seoul (South Korea)

Singapore

Tehran (Iran)

Tel Aviv (Israel)

Yangon (Myanmar)

Europe

Athens (Greece)

Belgrade

Kingdom of Yugoslavia

Socialist Federal Republic of Yugoslavia

Serbia and Montenegro

Serbia

Berlin

Germany
Finland's Representative at the German Empire and Weimar Republic based in Berlin.

German Democratic Republic
Finland's Representative at the German Democratic Republic based in East Berlin.

Federal Republic of Germany
Finland's Representative at the Federal Republic of Germany based in Bonn.

Germany
Finland's Representative at the Federal Republic of Germany based in Berlin.

Bern (Switzerland)

Bratislava

Republic of Slovakia (1939–1945)

Slovak Republic (1993–)

Bratislava Embassy was closed in 2015.

Brussels (Belgium)

Budapest (Hungary)

Bucharest (Romania)

Dublin (Ireland)

The Hague (Netherlands)

Kiev (Ukraine)

Copenhagen (Denmark)

Lisbon (Portugal)

Ljubljana (Slovenia)

Ljubljana  Embassy was closed in 2015.

London (United Kingdom)

Luxembourg

Luxembourg Embassy was closed in 2015.

Madrid (Spain)

Moscow

Soviet Union

Russia

Nicosia (Cyprus)

Oslo (Norway)

Paris (France)

Prague

Czechoslovakia

Czech Republic

Reykjavik (Iceland)

Riga (Latvia)

Rome (Italy)

Sofia (Bulgaria)

Tallinn (Estonia)

Stockholm (Sweden)

Warsaw (Poland)

Holy See

Finland's diplomatic relations to Holy See was Incumbented by the Bern, Madrid, Vienna, Cairo and Warsaw embassies.

Vilnius (Lithuania)

Vienna (Austria)

Zagreb (Croatia)

South America

Buenos Aires (Argentina)

Bogotá (Colombia)

Caracas (Venezuela)

Caracasin Embassy was closed in 2011.

Brasília (Brazil)

Lima (Peru)

Santiago (Chile)

North America

Ottawa (Canada)

Washington D.C. (United States)

Managua (Nicaragua)

Managuan Embassy was closed in 2013. The Ambassador is accredited from México

México (Mexico)

Havana (Cuba)

Finland's diplomatic relations to Cuba was Incumbented by the Embassy in México since 1992

International organisations

Organization for Security and Co-operation in Europe
Vienna

United Nations (New York City)

United Nations  and League of Nations (Geneva)

United Nations (Vienna)

Organisation for Economic Co-operation and Development
Paris

Organisation for the Prohibition of Chemical Weapons
The Hague

See also
List of current ambassadors of Finland

References

 
 
Finland